Dealul Spirii (Spirea's Hill) is a hill in Bucharest, Romania, upon which the Palace of the Parliament (formerly known as House of the People) is now located.

Spirii Hill
Initially a vineyard known as Dealul Lupeștilor, the hill was rebaptised after a doctor Spiridon Kristofi (also known as "Spirea"), who founded in 1765 the fortified Spirea Veche church; the latter was demolished in 1984 to build the House of the People.

Also on the hill were found the ruins of Curtea Nouă ("New Court"), the princely residence which was built in 1776 by Alexander Ypsilantis, Prince of Wallachia,  to replace Curtea Veche. It was built together with a large wine cellar, still in use during the 1900s. Curtea Nouă was the official residence of the Phanariotes until 1812, when it burnt down — it was since known as Curtea Arsă ("Burnt Court"), the ruins being razed completely in 1986.

In July 1818, Dealul Spirii saw the rising of a hot air balloon, an event witnessed by Prince John Caradja.

On 13 September 1848, the closing battle of the 1848 Wallachian Revolution was fought on the hill, involving the Ottoman troops sent to quell the rebels and the Firemen division of Bucharest, led by Pavel Zăgănescu.

Arsenal Hill
The hill was also the site of the Arsenal (established in 1861), which gave Dealul Spirii its alternate name, Dealul Arsenalului. Also located on this hill was Stadionul Republicii, an Art deco stadium inaugurated in 1928 as the "ANEF Stadium" (the stadium of the "National Academy of Physical Education) and used by the Progresul football team, now known as FC Național. The stadium was covered up during the construction of the House of the People. As of 2006, the remnants of the stadium are being converted into an underground parking lot.

After World War I, the hill gave its name to a famous trial (the Dealul Spirii Trial) that involved the members of the Romanian Communist Party, after a bomb was detonated on 8 December 1920 in the Romanian Senate (situated on the hill), which was detonated by Max Goldstein, a communist sympathizer.

Uranus Hill
This was one of the historic districts completely destroyed by Nicolae Ceaușescu's communist regime, in order to build the "House of the People" (see Ceaușima), part of the larger project to build the new Civic Centre of Bucharest.

It had been the site of many historic buildings, including a number of churches and synagogues. Also, when the hill was razed for the building, a mass grave was found under it. Further research showed that the skeletons belonged to people who died of the Black Death.

Notes

References
Șerban Cantacuzino, "Două Orașe Distincte" ("Two distinct cities"), Revista Secolul XX, 4/6 (1997), pp. 11–40
Constantin C. Giurescu, Istoria Bucureștilor. Din cele mai vechi timpuri pînă în zilele noastre ("History of Bucharest. From the earliest times until our day"), Ed. Pentru Literatură, Bucharest, 1966
Ştefan Tăbăraş, "Bucureşti, subliminale", in Revista 22, 22 March 2006
Ionel Zănescu, "Tăvălug", in Jurnalul Național'', 8 January 2007
Uranus Hill:  Images Uranus-Izvor district

Districts of Bucharest
Hills of Bucharest